Gordon A. Fleury (February 29, 1916 - November 2, 1987) served in the California State Assembly as a Republican during the 1940s and early 1950s. During World War II he served in the United States Navy.

References

United States Navy personnel of World War I
1916 births
1987 deaths
20th-century American politicians
Sacramento City College alumni
University of California, Hastings College of the Law alumni
Republican Party members of the California State Assembly